In November 2012, a series of ethnic clashes between the Samburu and Turkana tribes of Kenya's Samburu County resulted in the deaths of at least 46 people including police officers sent to quell the violence.

Cause of conflict
Tribal rivalry and fighting over cattle has been cited as the primary cause of the conflict.

Major incidents

November
In November 2012 over 40 Kenya Police officers and reservists  were killed in the Suguta Valley near Baragoi while on a mission to recover stolen cattle.

December
Four people were killed and several others injured in renewed cattle raids. This incident took place in Kewab in Baragoi when the Turkana and Samburu tribes.

Government response
As a result of the November incident, the Kenyan Parliamentary Committee on Security sent a team to probe the clashes.

See also
Crime in Kenya
Ethnic Conflicts in Kenya
Ethnic conflict

References

Ethnic conflicts
Conflicts in 2012
Mass murder in 2012
2012 in Kenya
Murder in Kenya
Massacres in Kenya
Samburu County
2012 murders in Kenya
Battles in 2012